José Flores (born 22 December 1930) is a Dutch Antillean weightlifter. He competed in the men's middle heavyweight event at the 1960 Summer Olympics.

References

1930 births
Living people
Dutch Antillean male weightlifters
Olympic weightlifters of the Netherlands Antilles
Weightlifters at the 1960 Summer Olympics
Place of birth missing (living people)
Weightlifters at the 1963 Pan American Games
Pan American Games medalists in weightlifting
Pan American Games silver medalists for the Netherlands Antilles
Medalists at the 1963 Pan American Games